Chuck Priore is the current head coach of the Stony Brook Seawolves football team, which represents Stony Brook University in the NCAA, and participates in the Colonial Athletic Association. Priore was hired prior to the 2006 season and he led the transition of Stony Brook into a full-scholarship FCS program from the 2006 season in which the team awarded an equivalent 27 scholarships. In 2007, the team played as an independent while adding scholarships and a tougher schedule. In 2008, Stony Brook joined the Big South Conference as a full–scholarship program. Priore led the Seawolves to three consecutive Big South championships (in 2009, 2010, 2011) and so far has compiled a 37–31 record. Under the leadership of Priore the Seawolves played their first ever FBS opponent, South Florida, in the 2010 season. In 2011, Stony Brook won their first outright Big South Championship and participated for the first time in the FCS playoffs, advancing to the Second Round.

Record

Seasons

2006 season

2007 season

2008 season

Stony Brook entered their new season with a 42–26 over Colgate on August 30.

2009 season

The Seawolves opened their season against their Long Island rivals, Hofstra, at Hempstead which ended in 17–10 loss to the Prade. The Seawolves then visited Colgate, losing the game in a 23–13 decision. Opening their home season at Stony Brook the Seawolves played Brown University Bears. The Bears went ahead in the game early on but the Seawolves were able to come back and claim the game with a touchdown with 47 seconds left in the game resulting in a 21–20 win in the home–opener. The Seawolves then visited UMass resulting in a 44–17 loss at Amherst. Seawolves entered their Conference play winning three games straight, losing at Charleston Southern and then winning their season finale against Liberty in a very close game at LaValle Stadium, 36–33.

2010 season

In the off–season Hofstra University, Stony Brook's Long Island rivals, announced that it would cut its football team for future season after 2009 leaving the Seawolves as the sole college football team in the long island area. As NCAA rules state, when a college team is cut, football athletes that transfer to another school don't need to meet residency requirements to start play. This led to five incoming transfer from Hofstra to begin play at Stony Brook including Miguel Mayonet, and Brock Jackolski for the 2010 season.

The 2010 season started with the first ever face off of the Seawolves against a  FBS team. Seawolves lead against South Florida 14–0 early in the game but lost control and gave up a loss at South Florida, 59–14. Stony Brook quickly recovered to beat American International 31–14. The Seawolves later on posted wins at every single conference game against the Big South and by November 14  had an overall 6–4 record and were 5–0 in the Big South. In one of the biggest upsets of Seawolves football history, their automatic bid faded away as they fell to the Liberty Flames on November 20 in a 54–28 game creating a three–way tie for the FCS playoff and sending Coastal Carolina to the FCS Playoffs (Seawolves allowed 122 point against BSC, Liberty 110, and CC allowed 109 in the tie–breaker) thus making the Seawolves Co–Champions of the Big South but eliminated from playoff contention on the last day of the season. The Seawolves are 13–4 overall in Big South games since 2008.

2011 season

2012 season

References

Stony Brook Seawolves football seasons